These are the official results of the Women's 400 metres event at the 1993 IAAF World Championships in Stuttgart, Germany. There were a total of 37 participating athletes, with five qualifying heats and the final held on Tuesday 1993-08-17.

Final

Semifinals
Held on Monday 1993-08-16

Qualifying heats
Held on Monday 1993-08-15

See also
 1990 Women's European Championships 400 metres (Split)
 1991 Women's World Championships 400 metres (Tokyo)
 1992 Women's Olympic 400 metres (Barcelona)
 1994 Women's European Championships 400 metres (Helsinki)
 1995 Women's World Championships 400 metres (Gothenburg)

References
 Results

 
400 metres at the World Athletics Championships
1993 in women's athletics